Mirza Mumtaz Hasan Kizilbash was the chief-minister of Khairpur state after its accession into Pakistan, from 1947 to 1955. He was inducted as a representative of Khairpur in the Constituent Assembly of Pakistan in December, 1949.

References 

Pakistani politicians
Year of birth missing
Year of death missing